Alger may refer to:

Places

Algeria 
 French name for Algiers, the capital of Algeria
 Roman Catholic Archdiocese of Alger
 Alger (department), a former French department (1848-1962)

Russia 
 Alger Island, Russia

United States 
 Alger, Michigan, in Arenac County
 Alger County, Michigan, in the Upper Peninsula
 Alger, Minnesota
 Alger, Ohio, a village
 Alger, Washington, a census-designated place
 Alger Creek, California
 Alger Falls, Michigan
 Alger Island, New York
 Alger Lakes, California
 Camp Alger, Virginia, a military camp established in 1898 for the Spanish–American War

Other uses 
 Alger (name), a list of people with the surname or given name
 Alger Theater, Detroit, Michigan, United States
 Commonwealth v. Alger, an 1851 court case in Massachusetts
 MC Alger, a football club based in Algiers
 USM Alger, a football club based in Algiers
 , a United States Navy World War II destroyer escort

See also
 
 
 Algeria (disambiguation)
 Algiers (disambiguation)